Giacinto Ghia (18 September 1887 – 21 February 1944) was an Italian automobile coachbuilder and founder of Carrozzeria Ghia.

Biography
Ghia was a test driver at Rapid and Diatto, prior to being seriously injured in 1915 — the same year he established Carrozzeria Ghia & Gariglio with his partner Gariglio.  After his factory was eradicated during an Allied bombing raid in 1943, he died of heart failure while overseeing the rebuilding of his company.

References

1887 births
1944 deaths
Automotive engineers from Turin
20th-century Italian engineers